WXXI (1370 AM) is a National Public Radio member station in Rochester, New York, broadcasting news, talk and informational programming on a 24-hour daily schedule. Its programs can also be heard on WXXI-FM's HD Radio signal.

History

WXXI dates its origins to July 2, 1984, when it signed on with its current mix of NPR news programming, local news and talk, and public affairs programming geared to serve adult listeners in the six-county Rochester metropolitan area which its signal covers. The station is the successor to WSAY, a facility founded and built by the late Gordon P. Brown in 1936 as a small local area station with a 250 watt signal on 1210 kHz. As a result of the NARBA agreement it moved to 1240 kHz in 1941. In the pre-war era WSAY became best known as the home of local music programs at a time when its network-affiliated competitors were airing a mix of local news and sports with national drama, comedy and music/variety shows supplied by the NBC and CBS networks. WSAY also was the first station to hire an African-American announcer for a regular shift.

Following World War II WSAY received FCC permission to improve its signal by moving to the regional 1370 kHz frequency. It relocated its transmitter from a downtown Rochester building with rooftop antenna to a modern four-tower plant in suburban Brighton. It increased power first to 1,000 watts and shortly afterward to 5,000 watts full-time. Over the next three decades WSAY operated under a number of formats, from pop standards to top 40 to progressive rock to country. Gordon Brown owned WSAY until his death in 1979, and his estate sold it to future Cumulus Media founder Lew Dickey and his family. The Dickey family operated it from 1980 to 1984, also under a variety of formats from personality adult contemporary to country to talk, eventually changing its callsign to WRTK. The license and facility was eventually sold to the WXXI Public Broadcasting Council, and briefly taken dark before its summer 1984 relaunch as WXXI(AM) with a round-the-clock noncommercial format of news, talk and public affairs.

On January 10, 2014, WXXI began simulcasting on 101.1 FM through translator W266CL, which moved to 107.5 FM on October 4, 2016, and changed the callsign to W298CH. On October 7, 2022, WXXI announced its purchase of the license of WJZR (105.9 FM), which it intends to relaunch in 2023 under a new call sign with a simulcast of WXXI (AM)'s programming.

Programming
The WXXI news and public affairs department produces local newscasts seven days a week and local talk programming every weekday, along with NPR news programming and locally produced documentary and specialty offerings. It currently operates from modern digital studios in the downtown Public Broadcasting Center, and upgraded transmitting facilities at the Brighton location first brought on line by Gordon Brown in 1946. Its programming is simulcast on the HD-2 channel of sister FM station WXXI-FM, and is streamed online 24 hours a day on the station's website. It has won numerous local, state and national awards for its program offerings.

References

External links
FCC History Cards for WXXI
WXXI official website

NPR member stations
XXI
Radio stations established in 1936
1936 establishments in New York (state)